Anthony Harnden  is Professor of Primary Care, General Practitioner and Fellow of St Hugh's College at Oxford University. He is also director of graduate studies for the Nuffield Department of Primary Care Health Sciences and sits on the General Medical Council, which is responsible for the regulation of all UK doctors and UK medical schools. He is also editorial advisor for the British Medical Journal. Harnden "has been the General Practitioner member of the Joint Committee of Vaccination and Immunisation (JCVI) since 2006 and Deputy Chairman since 2015."

Career
Harnden has specific research interests in influenza, pertussis and Kawasaki disease.

In September 2020, Harnden won (along with co-authors) the Ig Nobel Diagnostic Medicine Prize for "determining that acute appendicitis can be accurately diagnosed by the amount of pain evident when the patient is driven over speed bumps."

Other recognition
Some of Harnden's other titles or accomplishments include:
Governing Body Fellow of St Hugh's College
Chair of the Adolescent sub-committee of the JCVI
NICE Quality Standards Advisory Committee for Immunisation Uptake in the Under-19s
National Clinical Champion for Child Health at the Royal College of General Practitioners
Confidential Enquiry in Child Deaths
Board Trustee at the Centre for Maternal and Child Enquiries
Department of Health Pandemic Influenza Operational Advisory Group

COVID-19
Because "In order to prevent any perceived conflict of interest it was agreed that the JCVI Chair (Professor Andrew Pollard), who is involved in the development of a SARS-CoV-2 vaccine at Oxford, would recuse himself from all JCVI COVID-19 meetings", JCVI Deputy Chair Harnden acts in his stead on these matters.

On 2 December 2020, he was interviewed by American news channel CNN for more than 15 minutes because of his status on the JCVI, and forecast that "Priority groups in the UK will get vaccine by Easter." He mentioned the "JCVI statement" on Covid vaccines.

On 7 December 2020, he was interviewed on Sky News on the vaccine rollout, and he stressed that the scientific data on vaccines were studied very closely by the authorities and "the public should be reassured the vaccine has undergone “clear and rigorous safety trials”" and said "it is up to us all, if we’re offered the vaccine, to take it for not only ourselves but our friends and family and wider society in general." He disclosed that he had contracted Covid in March 2020 and that he had recurring long covid.

In January 2021, Harnden opined that "doctors should not ‘mix and match’ different types of COVID-19 jabs".

In February 2021 while on air at BBC Radio 4 where he was explaining his aforementioned vaccine opinion, Harnden was in such demand that he was "repeatedly interrupted"  by LBC producers.

Personal life
Harnden is married with three grown-up children, the eldest of whom studied at Leeds Medical School and is on the Yorkshire rheumatology training scheme.

References

British general practitioners
Fellows of St Hugh's College, Oxford
Living people
Year of birth missing (living people)